The Birmingham pen trade evolved in the Birmingham Jewellery Quarter and its surrounding area in the 19th century; for many years, the city was the centre of the world's pen trade, with most dip pens being produced there. At the height of the Jewellery Quarter's operations, there were about 100 pen factories, which employed around 8,000 skilled craftspeople.

The trade also pioneered craftsmanship, manufacturing processes and provided employment opportunities especially for women, who constituted more than 70% of the workforce. In its peak, there were about 100,000 varieties of pens manufactured in Birmingham. By the end of the 19th century the number of manufacturers had declined to just 12. The start of public sale of the Biro ballpoint pen in late 1945 caused further decline in the mass production of traditional pen nibs.

History

19th century 

John Mitchell manufactured pens in Newhall Street; he went on to pioneer the mass production of steel pens (prior to this, the quill was the most common form of writing instrument). The Mitchells are credited as being the first manufacturers to use machines to cut pen nibs, greatly speeding up the process. John's brother William later set up his own pen-making business in St Paul's square.

Baker and Finnemore operated in James Street, near St Paul's Square; C. Brandauer & Co Ltd. (founded as Ash & Petit) traded at 70 Navigation Street; Joseph Gillott & Sons Ltd. made pen nibs in Bread Street (now Cornwall Street) for companies such as Perry & Co.; Hinks, Wells & Co. traded in Buckingham Street; George W. Hughes traded in St Paul's Square; Leonardt & Catwinkle (then D. Leonardt & Co.) traded in George and Charlotte Streets, and M. Myers & Son. were based at 8 Newhall Street.

In 1828 Josiah Mason developed a cheap, efficient slip-in nib based on existing models, which could be added to a pen holder.

By the 1850s, Birmingham was the world center of steel pen and steel nib manufacture; more than half the steel-nib pens manufactured in the world were made there. Thousands of skilled craftsmen and women were employed in the industry. Many new manufacturing techniques were perfected in Birmingham, enabling the city's factories to mass-produce their pens cheaply and efficiently. These were sold worldwide to many who previously could not afford to write, thus encouraging the development of education and literacy.

Women made 18,000 pens a day, under strict rules of no talking, no singing, and no wasting of the metal among others. Men served as the toolmakers and looked after the furnaces but the majority of the workers in the factories were women. In the latter half of the 19th-century young children were also employed, with ages varying between 10–12 years old.

20th century 
Another manufacturer was Richard Esterbrook, who made quills in Cornwall, his home town. He started by working in the stationery trade of Birmingham, where he learnt about the mechanical process invented by Mitchell for making steel pen nibs. In searching for opportunities, Esterbrook realized there were no steel pen manufacturers in the United States. He approached five craftsmen who worked for John Mitchell in Navigation Street with an idea of setting up a business in Camden, New Jersey. Esterbrook later went on to become one of the largest steel-pen manufacturers in the world. He returned to Birmingham for help when in 1928 the British Government placed restrictions on US imports. John Mitchell's factory was used to produce Esterbrook pens within the UK, through an agreement with Esterbrook representatives. In 1930 Esterbrook introduced a fountain pen in Britain which had a nib made of osmiridium, which eventually replaced large-scale production of steel-tipped pens.

During World War II, pen manufacture in the city was somewhat disturbed. Mitchell's factory on Moland Street was struck by an incendiary bomb; the premises were partially rebuilt during the war with government aid, on condition that a government stationery office and ammunition assay office could reside there. The John Mitchell business and factory were sold to Esterbrook in 1947. Twenty years later, the Esterbrook Pen Co. was taken over by the "Venus Pencil Co", which had a modern factory in King's Lynn, Norfolk, to which Esterbrook's production was transferred until 1972.

Manufacturers 
Some of the main pen makers of Birmingham were: Baker & Finnemore, C. Brandauer & Co., Hinks Wells & Co., Joseph Gillott's, Geo W. Hughes, D. Leonardt & Co., Macniven & Cameron, Josiah Mason, John Mitchell, William Mitchell, M. Myers & Son, Perry & Co., A. Sommerville & Co.

See also 
 Calligraphy
 Dip pen
 List of pen types, brands and companies
 Pen Museum

References

External links 
 The Pen Museum
 William Mitchell
 Calligraphy website

Writing implements
Pens
Economy of Birmingham, West Midlands
Fountain pen and ink manufacturers
History of Birmingham, West Midlands